Aircraft ordnance or ordnance (in the context of military aviation) is any expendable weaponry (e.g. bombs, missiles, rockets and gun ammunition) used by military aircraft. The term is often used when describing the payload of air-to-ground weaponry that can be carried by the aircraft or the weight that has been dropped in combat. Aircraft ordnance also includes air-to-air, anti-ship and anti-submarine weapons.  

Some aircraft types can carry a wide variety of ordnance – for example, the Fairchild AU-23 Peacemaker could use forward-firing gun pods, 500 and 250 pound bombs, napalm units, cluster bomb units, flares, rockets, smoke grenades and propaganda leaflet dispensers.

Ordnance can be carried in a bomb bay or hung from a hardpoint.

For many weapons there is a limit to the length of time they can be flown (e.g. because of vibration damage); after this their safety or effectiveness is not guaranteed. This can be a problem if weapons designed for high intensity conflict are carried on multiple missions in a long counter-insurgency campaign.

References

See also
 List of aircraft weapons

Aircraft weapons